Kyle Richard Gass (born July 14, 1960) is an American musician, comedian and actor best known for co-founding—and being a member of—Tenacious D, a Grammy-winning comedy band. He also co-founded the bands Trainwreck and the Kyle Gass Band, with which he also performs.

Early life

Gass was born in Walnut Creek, California, and has two brothers. He attended Las Lomas High School, where he played flute in the marching band, graduating in 1978. He studied acting at UCLA School of Theater, Film and Television, where he met Tim Robbins. In 1982, he joined Robbins' The Actors' Gang and in the early 1990s met and befriended Jack Black in the group.

Career

Acting career
Gass first appeared on-screen in a 1988 7up Gold commercial, and made his film debut two years later in Brain Dead.

He made a cameo appearance in the Seinfeld episode "The Abstinence" in 1996, in a 1999 episode of the television show Fear of a Punk Planet, and in a 2003 episode of Friends, "The One With The Mugging" (S9 E15), as Phoebe's street friend Lowell. He appeared in music videos for Good Charlotte's 2002 song "Lifestyles of the Rich and Famous", the Foo Fighters' 1999 song "Learn to Fly", and I Prevail's 2017 song "Already Dead".

Gass has played small roles in many of Black's films (Year One, Kung Fu Panda, Shallow Hal, Saving Silverman, The Cable Guy, etc.). He starred with Black in the movie Tenacious D in the Pick of Destiny.

Gass appeared in Jacob's Ladder (1990), appeared as the "couch potato" in The Cable Guy (1996), and as an inept author of children's books in the comedy Elf (2003). He had a cameo role as a singing karaoke cowboy in Wild Hogs (2007). In 2008 he played the porn director in Extreme Movie, Walrus Boy in Wieners, the dirty trucker in the men's room in Sex Drive, and Decatur Doublewide in Lower Learning.

Music career

In Tenacious D, Gass plays lead guitar and sings backing vocals, and also plays the role of Black's comic foil in most of their comedy routines.

While appearing on Late Night with Conan O'Brien on November 15, 2006, Gass claimed to have been the youngest graduate of the Juilliard School of Music with a degree in classical guitar studies at the age of 13. Juilliard did not have a guitar program in 1973, but began its graduate level guitar program in 1989 under Sharon Isbin, and its undergraduate program in 2007. Earlier, in an article in the Sunday Times on October 29, 2006, Black stated that Gass was the youngest graduate of Juilliard. On May 13, 2008, Gass was a phone-in guest on the Adam Carolla Show.  When Adam Carolla asked him "... And did you go to Juilliard?" Kyle replied "I didn't. I—you know, I made that up as a joke," he continued, "and I thought it would be hilarious, and then I've been hearing about it ever since. Apologies to Juilliard."

In 2017, Gass performed the song "Penelope" for Amazon Music's "Love Me Not" compilation album.

In 2021, Gass announced his first solo tour "Kyle Gass Must Save the World", however it was later cancelled.

Other media 
Gass starred in a web show, Guitarings, with John Konesky and currently hosts the Did We Do It podcast with Kevin Weisman.
He has appeared as a contestant on the TV game show Sale of the Century.

Discography
Tenacious D (2001) — Tenacious D
Trainwreck Live (2004) — Trainwreck
The Pick of Destiny (2006) — Tenacious D
The Wreckoning (2009) — Trainwreck
Rize of the Fenix (2012) — Tenacious D
 Kyle Gass Band (2013) — Kyle Gass Band
 Tenacious D Live (2015) — Tenacious D
Thundering Herd (2016) — Kyle Gass Band
Post-Apocalypto (2018) — Tenacious D
Do You Wanna Get Wrecked? (2022) — Trainwreck

Filmography

Film

Television

Music videos

References

External links

External links

 

1960 births
21st-century American male actors
American comedy musicians
American male film actors
American male singer-songwriters
American male television actors
American rock guitarists
American male guitarists
American rock singers
American people of German descent
Comedy rock
Grammy Award winners
Living people
Male actors from the San Francisco Bay Area
Musicians from the San Francisco Bay Area
Singer-songwriters from California
Tenacious D members
University of California, Los Angeles alumni
American recorder players
People from Walnut Creek, California
Guitarists from California
20th-century American guitarists
20th-century American male actors
21st-century American comedians
Kyle Gass Band members
Trainwreck with Kyle Gass members
20th-century flautists